San Francisco de Coray is a municipality in the Honduran department of Valle.

Demographics
At the time of the 2013 Honduras census, San Francisco de Coray municipality had a population of 9,743. Of these, 98.56% were Mestizo, 0.72% Black or Afro-Honduran, 0.63% White, 0.08% Indigenous,  and 0.01% others.

References

Municipalities of the Valle Department